Alias the Night Wind is a 1923 American silent mystery film directed by Joseph Franz and starring William Russell, Maude Wayne and Charles K. French.

Cast
 William Russell as Bing Howard 
 Maude Wayne as Katherine Maxwell 
 Charles K. French as Amos Chester 
 Wade Boteler as Thomas Clancy 
 Donald MacDonald as Clifford Rushton 
 Milton Ross as R.J. Brown 
 Charles Wellesley as Police Commissioner 
 Mark Fenton as The Nurse 
 Otto Matieson as Detective 
 Robert Klein as Detective 
 Bert Lindley as Detective 
 Jack Miller as Stuart Clancy

References

Bibliography
 Solomon, Aubrey. The Fox Film Corporation, 1915-1935: A History and Filmography. McFarland, 2011.

External links

 

1923 films
1923 mystery films
American black-and-white films
American mystery films
American silent feature films
Silent mystery films
Fox Film films
Films directed by Joseph Franz
1920s English-language films
1920s American films